On 24 June 1878, a Baloch sepoy in the British Indian Army killed 6 people and injured 4 in Sindh, British Raj. The unnamed Sepoy man killed his mistress whom he had suspected of infidelity. Armed with a Martini-Henry and 100 rounds of ammunition, he went on a shooting spree in Hyderabad. He shot anyone in his proximity, eventually suffering a mortal gunshot wound caused by an officer armed with an Adams M1872 Mark III revolver.

References

 A savage sepoy shot, Huddersfield Chronicle (June 25, 1878)
 Wholesale Murder by a Sepoy, Dundee Courier (June 27, 1878)
 A murderous frenzy, Leicester Chronicle (June 29, 1878)

Spree shootings in India
June 1878 events
Mass murder in 1878
1878 in India
1878 murders in India